Allentown Queen City Municipal Airport  is a public airport in Lehigh County, Pennsylvania, on Lehigh Street two miles southwest of Allentown, Pennsylvania. It is owned by the Lehigh-Northampton Airport Authority. Also known as Queen City Airport, it is home to Civil Air Patrol Squadron 805 and Lehigh Valley Aviation Services, a fixed-base operator (FBO). Queen City Airport is also home to Vertivue Air Charters, a private airplane and helicopter charter service, and FlyGateway Aviation Institute (formerly Gateway Aviation), a multi-location flight school known for their Liberty University affiliation and FlyGateway's exclusive FastTrack Career Pilot Programs.

On 31 July 2008, the FAA airport identifier briefly changed from 1N9 to JVU.  After seeking approval for an identifier associated with the area, the FAA approved the change to XLL (Little Lehigh Executive, after the local Little Lehigh Creek) effective November 20, 2008.

Most U.S. airports use the same three-letter location identifier for the FAA and IATA,  but this airport has no IATA code.

History

World War II
In mid-December 1942, it was announced that Allentown was the site of a new aircraft production plant. Vultee Aircraft and Consolidated Aircraft announced that Consolidated Vultee (later known as Convair) would lease Mack Trucks' Plant 5C for production of the Consolidated Vultee TBY-2 Sea Wolf torpedo bomber for the United States Navy. In addition to 5C, Consolidated Vultee would build an office building, a hangar, an airport and a highway linking 5C (now Vultee Street) with the new airport complex.

Mack officials were initially reluctant to give up Plant 5C because they considered it essential for wartime truck production; however, the War Production Board and the Navy overruled them.

Convair Field, as the airfield was originally named, was dedicated on 10 October 1943.
 When the plant reached full production, it employed several thousand people, over half women. Consolidated Vultee became Allentown's second largest industry, handling over $100,000,000 in war contracts.  Along with the airfield and manufacturing facilities, a new neighborhood of homes was built for the aircraft workers and their families. In December 1943, the National Housing Center approved the construction of 250 units for Vultee workers on a tract bounded by Twelfth, Fourteenth, Harrison and Wyoming streets by the Allentown Housing Authority. This neighborhood, containing streets named "Liberator Avenue", "Catalina Avenue", and "Vultee Street", still exists.

By 1943, the facility was producing components for the BT-13 Valiant trainer and B-24 Liberator bomber.    In September 1943, Consolidated Vultee received an order to build 1,100 TBY-2 Sea Wolf torpedo bombers for the Navy.  However, production delays of almost a year caused the first aircraft to come off the line at Plant 5C on 20 August 1944, and the first production aircraft to be delivered to the Navy on 7 November. By this time, the usefulness of the plane became limited as the Grumman TBF Avenger was the primary torpedo bomber in combat, equipping all Navy torpedo squadrons. Subsequently, only 180 TBY-2s were produced and none saw combat, being used as trainers by the Navy in the United States.

With the end of the war in 1945, aircraft production was shut down. Plant 5C was returned to Mack Trucks and the remainder of the facility was declared surplus by the War Assets Administration.

Civil airport
On 10 July 1947, ownership of Convair Field was transferred from the federal government to the City of Allentown. As part of the transfer, the City agreed to keep it open as an airport and as an emergency landing field. In 1948, the Pennsylvania Air National Guard signed a lease to take over the aviation facilities for flight training in support of the 148th Fighter Squadron at Reading Airport. During the 1950s, a series of training exercises was carried out at Convair Field.

Due to budgetary cutbacks the Reserve Training Center at Reading was inactivated on 1 May 1950 and reassigned to New Castle County Airport, Delaware. The Air Force closed its facilities at Reading Airport and it returned to civil control. In 1951, the Air National Guard facilities in Allentown were turned over to Air Products and Chemicals.  Air Products paid $12,000/year in rent and that money was used to maintain the airport.   The runways were used by the Allentown Jaycees for drag racing in order to get "hot rods" off the city streets.   This did not last long, due to objections by local residents and also by the CAA as the runways were not being used by aviation. During the 1950s several plans were made to re-develop the land, but all never materialized due to the aviation clause in the transfer document to the City of Allentown in 1947.

In 1961, the City of Allentown took over full control of the facility and renamed it "Queen City Airport".  Aviation facilities were contracted to Reading Aviation for operation of the airfield.   In addition, the FAA allowed some of the land surrounding the airport to be used by private industry, which allowed the current industrial park along Vultee Street to be established.

Over the years, Queen City Airport has been the scene of numerous air shows and other events. In the 1980s, several popular hot-air balloon events were held there.  It was also the home of the annual Fourth of July fireworks display for a few years. Due to the commercial airline use of Allentown-Bethlehem-Easton Airport, Queen City is a popular home for General Aviation. In the 1990s, the controversy between the federal government and the City about its aviation use came up again,  and it was determined that if it were to be closed and redeveloped, a suitable substitute airport would need to be established to replace it.

Today, the airport is owned and operated by the Lehigh-Northampton Airport Authority, which bought it from the City in 2000. LNAA also manages the Lehigh Valley International Airport and Braden Airpark. In 2006, the airport received an award for the General Aviation Airport of the Year by the Eastern Region of the Federal Aviation Administration.

In 2013, the City of Allentown made it known that it wanted to buy a portion of the airport back from the LNAA which it currently leases for the City Streets department. This includes the World War II hangar which is now used as a garage for City vehicles. In addition, a large warehouse is proposed to be built on the airport site, although the airport runways and taxiways would be left intact for General Aviation use as part of the Aviation Clause with the FAA.

Facilities
It has two asphalt runways: 7/25 is 3,949 by 75 feet (1,204 x 23 m) and 15/33 is 3,159 by 75 feet (963 x 23 m).

In the year ending 10 June 2008 the airport had 54,220 aircraft operations, average 148 per day: 97% general aviation, 2% air taxi and 1% military. 95 aircraft were then based at this airport: 78% single-engine, 16% multi-engine and 6% helicopter.

References

External links 
 Queen City Municipal Airport at PennDOT Bureau of Aviation
 Civil Air Patrol Squadron 805
 

Airports in Pennsylvania
County airports in Pennsylvania
Buildings and structures in Allentown, Pennsylvania
Transportation buildings and structures in Lehigh County, Pennsylvania
Transportation in Allentown, Pennsylvania